Raging Spirits is a roller coaster attraction in Tokyo DisneySea, began operation on July 21, 2005. Created by Walt Disney Imagineering, manufactured by Intamin and built by Sansei Technologies, the attraction takes guests on a thrilling, high-speed ride through the ruins of an ancient ceremonial site and its depictions of Incan buildings in the mountainous region of Peru. The attraction is located in Tokyo DisneySea's Lost River Delta section.

Much like the roller coaster design on which it is based—the Indiana Jones et le Temple du Péril attraction at Disneyland Paris —guests riding Raging Spirits board hopper cars that propel them along tracks around the archeological excavation site.

This ride is the only attraction at Tokyo Disney Resort to feature an inversion, with its single vertical loop.

References

External links 
 

Tokyo DisneySea
Lost River Delta (Tokyo DisneySea)
Roller coasters operated by Walt Disney Parks and Resorts
Walt Disney Parks and Resorts attractions
2005 establishments in Japan